The Samana least gecko (Sphaerodactylus samanensis) is a species of lizard in the family Sphaerodactylidae. It is endemic to the Dominican Republic.

References

Sphaerodactylus
Reptiles of the Dominican Republic
Endemic fauna of the Dominican Republic
Reptiles described in 1932
Taxa named by Doris Mable Cochran